Hurka Union is an Union Parishad under Rampal Upazila of Bagerhat District in the division of Khulna, Bangladesh. It has an area of 45.74 km2 (17.66 sq mi) and a population of 7,420.

References

Unions of Rampal Upazila
Unions of Bagerhat District
Unions of Khulna Division